The 2014–15 Colgate Raiders women's basketball team represented Colgate University during the 2014–15 NCAA Division I women's basketball season. The Raiders, led by fourth year head coach Nicci Hays Fort, played their home games at Cotterell Court and were members of the Patriot League. They finished the season 9–22, 7–11 in Patriot League play to finish in seventh place. They advance to the quarterfinals of the Patriot League women's tournament where they lost to Army.

Roster

Schedule

|-
!colspan=9 style="background:#800000; color:#FFFFFF;"| Exhibition

|-
!colspan=9 style="background:#800000; color:#FFFFFF;"| Non-conference regular season

|-
!colspan=9 style="background:#800000; color:#FFFFFF;"| Patriot regular season

|-
!colspan=9 style="background:#800000; color:#FFFFFF;"| Patriot League Tournament

See also
 2014–15 Colgate Raiders men's basketball team

References

Colgate
Colgate Raiders women's basketball seasons